The Slovak citizen ID card (Slovak: Občiansky preukaz, citizen card, literally civic certificate) is the identity document used in the Slovak Republic (and formerly in Czechoslovakia), in addition to the Slovak passport. It is issued to all citizens, and every person above 15 years of age permanently living in Slovakia. It is required by law to hold a valid identity card. A Slovak ID card can be used for travel in all member states of the European Union and the Schengen Area as well as several other European countries (including Balkan countries, for example North Macedonia and Serbia).

The identity cards are produced in Devínska Nová Ves, Bratislava.

In 2017, it was reported to be affected by the ROCA vulnerability, potentially allowing the cards to be cheaply spoofed.

A new biometric ID card with NFC chip has been issued since 1 December 2022.

History

During the communist regime (1948–89) this simple card developed into a booklet dozens of pages long. It contained such personal details as employment history and vaccination records.

See also
 Slovak passport
 National identity cards in the European Union
 ROCA vulnerability
 Smart card
 Czech national identity card

References

Government of Slovakia
Slovakia